Rune Börjesson (5 April 1937 – 21 February 1996) was a Swedish professional footballer who played as a forward. He was the Allsvenskan top scorer in 1959 and 1960 while at Örgryte IS, and later played professionally in Serie A with Juventus and Palermo. A full international between 1958 and 1961, he won 20 caps and scored 17 goals for the Sweden national team.

Club career

Early career 
Rune Börjesson started off his career with Hovås IF, before being signed by Örgryte IS at the age of 14. While at Örgryte, Börjesson formed a successful striker partnership with the prolific striker Agne Simonsson. In 1955, Börjesson was awarded GT's Kristallkulan as the best player in West Sweden.

During the 1957–58 Division 2 Västra Götaland season, Börjesson helped Örgryte win promotion to Allsvenskan for the first time in 19 years by scoring a total of 40 goals. In his first ever Allsvenskan season, Börjesson finished as the Allsvenskan top scorer with 21 goals, as Örgryte claimed a respectable fourth position in the 1959 table. The following season Börjesson yet again finished as the league's top scorer with 24 goals, helping his team finish third.

Serie A 
Börjesson signed with the Italian Serie A team Juventus after the 1961 Allsvenskan season but was quickly loaned out to Palermo where he spent two seasons, playing in 38 games and scoring 10 goals.

Return to Örgryte 
Börjesson returned to Örgryte in 1963 after his stint in Italy and was reunited with his former striker partner Agne Simonsson, who had returned from a spell in La Liga with Real Madrid and Real Sociedad. He left Örgryte at the end of the 1967 Allsvenskan season to round up his career with his boyhood club Hovås IF.

Börjesson scored a total of 91 goals in 125 Allsvenskan games during his two stints at Örgryte IS. In all divisions for Örgryte, he scored a total of 202 league goals, which puts him second behind Agne Simonsson for most league goals of all time for Örgryte.

International career 
Börjesson started his international career with the Sweden U21 team, representing them in three games. Prior to making his senior debut, he also represented the Sweden B team twice, scoring two goals.

Börjesson eventually made his international senior debut for Sweden in a home game against Norway on 14 September 1958, in which he also scored his first international goal. He played for Sweden in their unsuccessful 1962 FIFA World Cup qualifying campaign, but never appeared in a major tournament. He won a total of 20 caps for Sweden, scoring 17 goals.

Career statistics

International 
Appearances and goals by national team and year

 Scores and results list Sweden's goal tally first, score column indicates score after each Börjesson goal.

Honours 
Örgryte IS
 Division 2 Västra Götaland: 1957–58

Individual
 Allsvenskan top scorer: 1959, 1960
 Kristallkulan: 1955
Stor Grabb: 1960

References 

1937 births
1996 deaths
Swedish footballers
Association football forwards
Sweden international footballers
Juventus F.C. players
Footballers from Gothenburg